Chumakov or Chumakova may refer to:

 Chumakov (village), a village (khutor) in the Republic of Adygea, Russia
 5465 Chumakov, an asteroid named for Mikhail Chumakov (1909–1993)

People with the surname
 Aleksandr Chumakov (footballer) (1948–2012), Soviet footballer
 Alexander N. Chumakov (born 1950), Russian philosopher, theoretician of science and scientific community organizer
 Aleksandr Chumakov (sailor) (1927–2019), Russian sailor
 Aleksandr Petrovich Chumakov (born 1941), Belarusian Army general and former Minister of Defence of Belarus
 Mikhail Chumakov (1909–1993), Russian virologist
 Natalia Chumakova (born 1969), Russian musician and journalist
 Sergey Chumakov (canoeist) (1928–1994), Soviet sprint canoer
 Sergey Chumakov (singer) (born 1972), Soviet and Russian singer
 Olesya Chumakova (born 1981), Russian middle-distance runner
 Roza Chumakova (1924–2007), Russian rower

See also 
 Chumak (disambiguation)
 Chumachenko